Tell Me O Kkhuda is a 2011 Indian Hindi-language drama film directed by Hema Malini, starring Esha Deol, Arjan Bajwa, Sudhanshu Pandey, Vinod Khanna, Dharmendra, Rishi Kapoor, Farooq Sheikh, Deepti Naval and Chandan Roy Sanyal in the lead roles; Salman Khan makes a special appearance. It released on 27 October 2011 coinciding with Diwali festival to mixed reviews at the box office. The music is composed by Pritam and lyrics were by Mayur Puri.

The film bears a resemblance to Malini's first directional venture Dil Aashna Hai (1992) and is an unofficial remake of the 2008 Hollywood hit Mamma Mia!.

Plot
The film tells the story of a girl named Tanya (Esha Deol) who learns that she was adopted by Colonel Ravi Kapoor and his wife when he rescued her from a burning hospital. This leads Tanya to go on a journey in search of her biological parents.

The first man she visits is the ruler of a patriarchal district in Rajasthan, Abhay Rana Pratap Singh (Vinod Khanna), where female infanticide is common. However, it is revealed that Manjuri, brought up as Singh's niece, is his actual daughter. Her nanny had hidden the truth from everyone and even Rana Pratap hadn't known that his wife had given birth to a baby girl before dying in a fire.

Tanya then travels to Turkey to meet Altaf Zardari (Rishi Kapoor). Zardari and his non-Indian wife live a peaceful life, but the wife doesn't remember losing her baby girl in the fire that demolished the hospital Tanya was born in. Tanya helps her regain her memory about the incident and accept her daughter's death. A heartbroken Tanya returns to India to her foster parents.

She then embarks on one last mission to find her father - this time to see Tony Castello (Dharmendra), a mafia leader. Initially doubtful of her, Tony meets up with his ex-flame, Susan (Hema Malini), who is now a nun. Eventually, after a gang fight, Tony accepts Tanya as his daughter and the movie ends with Tanya and her best friend (Arjan Bajwa) marrying in a church, with all four of Tanya's fathers walking her down the aisle.

Cast
 Dharmendra as Don Anthony Costello
 Esha Deol as Tanya R. Kapoor
 Vinod Khanna as Abhay Rana Pratap Singh
 Rishi Kapoor as Altaf Zardari
 Farooq Sheikh as Ravi Kapoor
 Deepti Naval as Mrs. R. Kapoor
 Hema Malini as Susan D'Mello
 Arjan Bajwa as Jai Vishal Singh
 Salman Khan as himself 
 Sudhanshu Pandey as Kunwar Virat Pratap
 Chandan Roy Sanyal as Kuki (Tanya & Jai's friend)
 Hema Malini as Susan D'Mello
 Sharat Saxena as Danny
 Madhoo as Geeta (Geeta Bhabhi)
 Johnny Lever as Pandurang P.
 Meltem Cumbul as Zainab Zardari
Richa Pallod

Production

The film was shot in  Mehboob Studio. Most of the film was filmed in Turkey, with Turkish star Meltem Cumbul, who has a guest appearance. It was promoted by Videocon on the posters.

Though the film was to release on 30 September 2011, it was pushed back a month due to personal incidents of the crew.

Box office

The film had poor box office collections due to its clash with mega budget Ra.One(another Diwali release. BoxofficeIndia.com declared the film a disaster.

Soundtrack
The music of the film was composed by Pritam and the lyrics were written by Mayur Puri.

References

External links
 
 
 Tell Me O Kkhuda on Sulekha

2011 films
Indian remakes of American films
2010s Hindi-language films
Films featuring songs by Pritam
Films shot in Turkey